The Miss Virginia's Outstanding Teen competition is the pageant that selects the representative for the Commonwealth of Virginia in the Miss America's Outstanding Teen pageant. The pageant is held each June at Bergland Center in Roanoke, Virginia during the same week as the Miss Virginia pageant.

Ayana Johnson of Suffolk was crowned Miss Virginia's Outstanding Teen on June 25, 2022 at Bergland Center in Roanoke, Virginia. She competed in the Miss America's Outstanding Teen 2023 pageant at the Hyatt Regency Dallas in Dallas, Texas on August 8-12, 2022 where she was a Teens in Action finalist.

Results summary
The year in parentheses indicates the year of the Miss America's Outstanding Teen competition the award/placement was garnered.

Placements
 Miss America's Outstanding Teens: Caitlin Brunell (2008)
 2nd runners-up: Brittany Young (2007), Emily Kinsey (2019)
 3rd runners-up: Casey Shepard (2015)
 4th runners-up: Courtney Jamison (2011), Cassie Donegan (2014)
 Top 10: Lexie Overholt (2009), Courtney Garrett (2010), Andolyn Medina (2013)

Awards

Preliminary awards
 Preliminary Evening Wear/On Stage Question: Caitlin Brunell (2008), Courtney Jamison (2011), Andolyn Medina (2013)
 Preliminary Talent: Courtney Jamison (2011), Cassie Donegan (2014)

Other awards
 Academic Achievement: Hayley Boland (2016)
 Outstanding Vocalist: Cassie Donegan (2014)
 Outstanding Instrumentalist: Courtney Jamison (2011), Hayley Boland (2016)
 Teen in Action Award Winners: Andolyn Medina (2013)
 Teen in Action Award Finalists: Hayley Boland (2016), Morgan Rhudy (2020), Ayana Johnson (2023)

Winners

References

External links
 Official website

Virginia
Virginia culture
Women in Virginia
Annual events in Virginia